Flora is a Prague Metro station on Line A. It is located under the shopping mall Atrium Flora, on the border of the Vinohrady and Žižkov districts near the Olšany Cemetery. The station was opened on 19 December 1980 as part of the extension of the line between Náměstí Míru and Želivského.

Characteristics
Flora is a three-bore station with a short, 33 meter middle tunnel, 6 pairs of boarding zones and prefabricated, cast-iron panels on the station walls. It is 108 meters long and only 26 meters deep, making it one of the shallowest stations on the entire line. From the middle bore, an exit escalator goes through a tunnel to an underground vestibule (4.75 meters underground), which is attached to the shopping mall Palác Flora (2003). One can access Palác Flora by going through the immediate right exit after going up the escalator. There are six more exits from the vestibule to the street. The station is covered in gold and wine-colored die-cast aluminum panels, and also with decorative gray stone. Construction of the station cost 254 million Czechoslovak crowns.

Gallery

References

External links

 Gallery and information 

Prague Metro stations
Railway stations opened in 1980
1980 establishments in Czechoslovakia
Railway stations in the Czech Republic opened in the 20th century